The Legislative Assembly of Lower Canada was the lower house of the bicameral structure of provincial government in Lower Canada until 1838. The legislative assembly was created by the Constitutional Act of 1791. The lower house consisted of elected legislative councilors who created bills to be passed up to the Legislative Council of Lower Canada, whose members were appointed by the governor general.

Following the Lower Canada Rebellion, the lower house was dissolved on March 27, 1838, and Lower Canada was administered by an appointed Special Council. With the Act of Union in 1840, a new lower chamber, the Legislative Assembly of Canada, was created for both Upper and Lower Canada which existed  until 1867, when the Legislative Assembly of Quebec was created.

Speaker of the House of Assembly of Lower Canada 

 Jean-Antoine Panet 1792–1794
 Michel-Eustache-Gaspard-Alain Chartier de Lotbinière 1794–1796
 Jean-Antoine Panet 1797-1814
 Louis-Joseph Papineau 1815–1822
 Joseph-Remi Vallieres de Saint-Real 1823–1825
 Louis-Joseph Papineau 1825–1841

Electoral Districts

From 1792 to 1829
50 members
elected in 23 two-seat districts and four single-seat districts.

Buildings 

See Old Parliament Building (Quebec)

See also 
Executive Council of Lower Canada
Constitutional history of Canada

External links 
 
 
 Parliament of Canada (Montmorency Park)

1791 establishments in Lower Canada
1838 disestablishments in Lower Canada
Canada, Lower